The women's 1500 metres at the 2014 IAAF World Indoor Championships took place on 7–8 March 2014.

Medalists

Records

Qualification standards

Schedule

Results

Heats

Qualification: First 2 in each heat (Q) and the next 3 fastest (q) qualified for the final.

Final

References

1500 metres
1500 metres at the World Athletics Indoor Championships
2014 in women's athletics